The 1933 Stanley Cup Finals was played between the New York Rangers and the Toronto Maple Leafs, in a rematch of the 1932 Finals. The Rangers won the series 3–1 to win their second Stanley Cup.

Paths to the Finals
Toronto defeated the Boston Bruins 3–2 in a best-of-five series to reach the Finals. New York defeated the Montreal Canadiens 8—5 and Detroit Red Wings 6–3 to reach the Finals.

Game summaries
After game one, the Rangers would vacate Madison Square Garden for the circus. Bill Cook would become the first player to score a Cup-winning goal in overtime. Rookie goalie Andy Aitkenhead posted the fourth shutout by a rookie in the Finals.

Stanley Cup engraving
The 1933 Stanley Cup was presented to Rangers captain Bill Cook by NHL President Frank Calder following the Rangers 1–0 overtime win over the Maple Leafs in game four.

The following Rangers players and staff had their names engraved on the Stanley Cup

1932–33 New York Rangers

See also
1932–33 NHL season

References & notes
 

 Podnieks, Andrew; Hockey Hall of Fame (2004). Lord Stanley's Cup. Bolton, Ont.: Fenn Pub. pp 12, 50. 

Stanley Cup
Stanley Cup Finals
New York Rangers games
Toronto Maple Leafs games
Stanley Cup Finals
Stanley Cup Finals
Stanley Cup Finals
Ice hockey competitions in New York City
Ice hockey competitions in Toronto
1930s in Toronto
Stanley Cup Finals
1930s in Manhattan